The Examination of a Witch is a painting by T. H. Matteson. There are two versions of the painting, one in the Peabody Essex Museum in Salem, Massachusetts, the other in the Portrait Gallery of the Darwin R. Barker Museum.

The time the painting was set

The painting may represent an event in 1692, during the Salem witch trials, the subject being one Mary Fisher. The year of 1656 is more likely, as Mary was then captured with Ann Austin, which makes 1692 less likely than 1656.

As Mary Fisher was a Quaker, the Puritans did not welcome her, having condemned the Boston martyrs, a group of Quakers, to death. In the painting, some have visibly fainted. Note how she is being shamefully stripped to determine whether or not she was a witch, but the witches' mark is on her, confirming her guilt.

Inspiration

At the first exhibition of the painting in New York in 1848, T. H. Matteson exhibited an earlier version of this painting, using  as his inspiration a quotation from John Greenleaf Whittier's book Supernaturalism of New England. Matteson quoted Whittier, "Mary Fisher, a young girl, was seized upon by Deputy Governor Bellingham in the absence of Governor Endicott, and shamefully stripped for the purpose of ascertaining whether she was a witch, with the Devil's mark upon her.". Richard Bellingham left office, in 1672, adding doubt, about the year of 1692. Whittier's entire quote follows:

See also

 Cultural depictions of the Salem witch trials
 History of the Puritans in North America
 Increase Mather
 List of people of the Salem witch trials
 Protests against early modern witch trials
 Quakers in North America
 Timeline of the Salem witch trials
 Samuel Willard
 Witchcraft
 Witches' mark

References

External links and references

 One site that writes of the painting
 mtsu.edu site
 A fourth site
 Confirms the painting as oil-on-canvas
 Mentions the painting's dimensions

1853 paintings